Patrick de Paula Carreiro (born 8 September 1999), commonly known as Patrick de Paula or simply Patrick, is a Brazilian footballer who plays for Botafogo as a midfielder.

Club career

Palmeiras
Born in Rio de Janeiro, Patrick de Paula joined Palmeiras' youth setup in 2017, after playing amateur tournaments in his hometown. On 6 January 2019, he signed a contract extension with the club until the end of the year; in May, he further extended his deal until 2022.

On 28 November 2019, Patrick de Paula was promoted to Palmeiras' first team for the ensuing campaign. He made his senior debut the following 26 January, coming on as a late substitute for fellow youth graduate Gabriel Menino in a 0–0 Campeonato Paulista home draw against São Paulo.

Botafogo
After several speculations, Botafogo decided to pay the offer in accordance with the request by Palmeiras: 6 million euros (about R$ 33.3 million) for 50% of the federative rights of the shirt 5 alviverde, which turned into the signing most expensive in the history of Botafogo. The deal proposed by the team from Rio met the expectations of Leila Pereira's management at Palmeiras, after all, the club from São Paulo would continue with a percentage of the player and would win in the event of a future negotiation.

It wasn't the debut of Patrick de Paula's dreams, he and Alvinegro were defeated 3-1 by Corinthians on April 10, at Estádio Nilton Santos, for the Campeonato Brasileiro.Patrick scored his first goal for Fogão in the 3-0 victory, in the first leg of the third phase of the Copa do Brasil, where Botafogo beat Ceilândia.

Patrick de Paula had a serious injury detected in his left knee in the match against Flamengo for the Campeonato Carioca, after being submitted to imaging tests, he was detected an injury that will require a surgical procedure. His recovery will last throughout this season.

Career statistics

Honours 
Palmeiras
 Copa Libertadores: 2020, 2021
 Copa do Brasil: 2020
 Campeonato Paulista: 2020, 2022
 Recopa Sudamericana: 2022
Individual
 Campeonato Paulista Team of the Year: 2020
 Campeonato Paulista Young Player of the Season: 2020

References

External links
Palmeiras official profile 

1999 births
Living people
Footballers from Rio de Janeiro (city)
Brazilian footballers
Association football midfielders
Campeonato Brasileiro Série A players
Sociedade Esportiva Palmeiras players
Botafogo de Futebol e Regatas players